Shams ad-Dīn adh-Dhahabī, also known as Shams ad-Dīn Abū ʿAbdillāh Muḥammad ibn Aḥmad ibn ʿUthmān ibn Qāymāẓ ibn ʿAbdillāh at-Turkumānī al-Fāriqī ad-Dimashqī (5 October 1274 – 3 February 1348) was an Islamic historian and Hadith expert.

Life
Of Arab descent, Adh-Dhahabi was born in Damascus. His name, ibn adh-Dhahabi (son of the goldsmith), reveals his father's profession. He began his study of hadith at age eighteen, travelling from Damascus to Baalbek, Homs, Hama, Aleppo, Nabulus, Cairo, Alexandria, Jerusalem, Hijaz, and elsewhere, before returning to Damascus to teach and write.  He authored many works and was widely renown as a perspicuous critic and expert examiner of the hadith. He wrote an encyclopaedic biographical history and was the foremost authority on the canonical readings of the Qur'an. Some of his teachers were women. At Baalbek, Zaynab bint ʿUmar b. al-Kindī was among his most influential teachers.

Adh-Dhahabi lost his sight two years before he died, leaving three children: the eldest, his daughter, Amat al-'Aziz, and his two sons, 'Abd Allah and Abu Hurayra 'Abd al-Rahman. The latter son taught the hadith masters Ibn Nasir-ud-din al-Damishqi and Ibn Hajar, and through them transmitted several works authored or narrated by his father.

Teachers
Among adh-Dhahabi's most notable teachers in hadith, fiqh and aqida:
 Abd al-Khaliq bin ʿUlwān
 Zaynab bint ʿUmar bin al-Kindī
 Abu al-Hasan 'Ali ibn Mas‘ud ibn Nafis al-Musali
 Ibn Taymiyyah Taqi ad-Din Ahmad ibn Taymiyyah
 Ibn al-Zahiri, Ahmad ibn Muhammad ibn 'Abd Allah al-Halabi
 Sharaf-ud-din Abd al-Mu'min ibn Khalaf al-Dimyati, the foremost Egyptian authority on hadith in his time
 Ibn Daqiq al-'Id, whom he identified in his youth as Abu al-Fath al-Qushayri, later as Ibn Wahb.
 Jamal-ud-din Abu al-Ma`ali Muhammad ibn 'Ali al-Ansari al-Zamalkani al-Damishqi al-Shafi`i (d. 727), whom he called "Qadi al-Qudat, the Paragon of Islam, the standard-bearer of the Sunna, my shaykh".
 Ahmad ibn Ishaq ibn Muhammad al-Abarquhi al-Misri (d. 701), from which al-Dhahabi received the Suhrawardi Sufi path.
 Ibn al-Kharrat al-Dawalibi

Notable students
 Imad ad-Din Isma'il bin 'Umar bin Kathir 
 Zain ad-Din 'Abd ar-Rahmān ibn al-Hasan as-Sulamī (Ibn Rajab)
 Shams-ud-din Abu al Mahasin Muhammad ibn Ali al-Dimashqi
 Taj al-Din al-Subki
 Ibn Asakir
 Khalīl ibn Aybak al-Ṣafadī
 Ibn al-Furat

Works
Adh-Dhahabi authored nearly a hundred works of history, biography and theology. His history of medicine begins with Ancient Greek and Indian practices and practitioners, such as Hippocrates, Galen, etc., through the Pre-Islamic Arabian era, to Prophetic medicine  as revealed by the Muslim prophet Muhammad to the medical knowledge contained in works of scholars such as Ibn Sina. The following are the better known titles:

Tarikh al-Islam al-kabir 'Great History of Islam' (50 vols., in Arabic); Ibn Hajar received it from Abu Hurayra ibn adh-Dhahabi; comprising over 30,000 biographical records.
Siyar a`lam al-nubala ('The Lives of Noble Figures'), 28 volumes, a unique encyclopaedia of biographical history.

al-'Uluww
al-Mowqizah
Al-'Ibar fī khabar man ghabar
Tadhhib Tahdhib al-Kamal; abridgement of al-Mizzi's abridgement of al-Maqdisi's Al-Kamal fi Asma' al-Rijal, a biographical compendium of hadith narrators from the Six major Hadith collections.
Al-Kashif fi Ma`rifa Man Lahu Riwaya fi al-Kutub al-Sitta; abridgment of the Tadhhib.
Al-Mujarrad fi Asma' Rijal al-Kutub al-Sitta; abridgment of the Kashif.
Mukhtasar Kitab al-Wahm wa al-Iham li Ibn al-Qattan.
Mukhtasar Sunan al-Bayhaqi; selected edition of Bayhaqi's Sunan al-Kubara.
Mukhtasar al-Mustadrak li al-Hakim, an abridgement of Hakim's Al-Mustadrak alaa al-Sahihain.
Al-Amsar Dhawat al-Athar (Cities Rich in Historical Relics); begins with a description of Madina al-Munawwara.
Al-Tajrid fi Asma' al-Sahaba; dictionary of the Companions of the prophet Muhammad.
 (The Memorial of the Hadith Masters); chronological history of the biography of hadith masters. Ibn Hajar received it from Abu Hurayra ibn adh-Dhahabi.
Tabaqat al-Qurra (Categories of the Qur'anic Scholars); Biographic anthology.
Al-Mu`in fi Tabaqat al-Muhaddithin, a compendium of hadith scholars (Muhaddithin).
Duwal al-Islam (The Islamic Nations); concise political histories of Islamic nations.
Al-Kaba'ir (Cardinal Sins)
Manaaqib Al-imam Abu Hanifa wa saahibayhi Abu Yusuf wa Muhammad Ibn al-Hasan (The Honoured status of Imam Abu Hanifa and his two companions, Abu Yusuf and Muhammad ibn Al-Hasan)
Mizaan-ul-I’tidaal, a reworking of al-Kamil fi Dhu'afa' al-Rijal by Ibn 'Adi al-Jurjani (d. 277 H)

See also
Islamic scholars

References

1274 births
1348 deaths
14th-century biographers
14th-century Syrian historians
14th-century Muslim scholars of Islam
14th-century scholars
14th-century Arabs
Atharis
Hadith scholars
Scholars from the Mamluk Sultanate
Encyclopedists of the medieval Islamic world
Historians of the medieval Islamic world
Writers from Damascus
Shafi'is
Syrian Sunni Muslim scholars of Islam
Proto-Salafists
14th-century jurists
Biographical evaluation scholars
Critics of Ibn Arabi